Joe  or Joseph Connolly may refer to:

Joe Connolly (1910s outfielder) (1884–1943), Major League Baseball outfielder from 1913 to 1916
Joe Connolly (1920s outfielder) (1894–1960), Major League Baseball outfielder from 1921 to 1924
Joe Connolly (hurler) (born 1956), Irish hurler, board member of Irish television broadcaster TG4
Joseph Connolly (Irish politician) (1885–1961), Irish Fianna Fáil politician
Joseph Connolly (author) (born 1950), British journalist, novelist, non-fiction writer and bibliophile
Joseph Connolly (architect) (1840–1904), Irish Canadian architect, born in Limerick, Ireland
Joseph Edward Connolly (1904–1942), U.S. Marine awarded the Navy Cross
Joseph M. Connolly (1924–2007), American police detective and politician in the Massachusetts House of Representatives
Joseph E. Connolly (1887–1973), Canadian politician in the Legislative Assembly of New Brunswick
Joseph Connolly, treasurer of Norfolk County, Massachusetts
SS Joseph V. Connolly, a Liberty ship

See also
Joe Connelly (disambiguation)